The Orne Covered Bridge is a replica of a historic bridge on Back Coventry Road in Irasburg, Vermont.  Built in 2000, it is a replacement for a 19th-century bridge which stood on the site until it was destroyed by arson in 1997.  The historic bridge was listed on the National Register of Historic Places in 1974.

Description and history
The Orne Covered Bridge stands in far northern Irasburg, just south of the main village of Coventry, on Back Coventry Road. It is a single-span Paddleford truss structure, oriented in a roughly east–west direction across the Black River. It has a gabled metal roof, and is clad in vertical board siding, which extends around to the insides of the portals. The siding on the portal ends extends outward to meet the ends of the gables, which extend  beyond the sides. The deck consists of wooden planking.

The exact date of construction of the historic bridge is uncertain, as is its builder.  Different sources claim construction dates of 1879 and 1881, and the builder as either E.P. Colton or John Colton.  At the time of its listing on the National Register of Historic Places in 1974, it had had no substantive alterations, notably not having had strengthening elements added.  It was also the only surviving historic Paddleford truss bridge on a public roadway in the state.  It was destroyed by an arsonist in 1997; the present bridge was completed in 2000.

See also
 
 
 
 
 List of covered bridges in Vermont
 National Register of Historic Places listings in Orleans County, Vermont
 List of bridges on the National Register of Historic Places in Vermont

References

Covered bridges on the National Register of Historic Places in Vermont
National Register of Historic Places in Orleans County, Vermont
Bridges in Orleans County, Vermont
Buildings and structures in Irasburg, Vermont
Road bridges in Vermont
Wooden bridges in Vermont
Long truss bridges in the United States
Covered bridges in the United States destroyed by arson